Bobbed Hair is a 1925 American silent comedy film directed by Alan Crosland and starring Marie Prevost, Kenneth Harlan, Louise Fazenda, and Dolores Costello. It was based on a 1925 novel of the same name written by twenty different authors. The film was produced and distributed by Warner Bros.

Co-authors of the novel

George Agnew Chamberlain – novelist
George Barr McCutcheon – novelist
Robert Gordon Anderson – short story writer 
George P. Putnam – publisher of the novel
Alexander Woollcott – critic and essayist (The Man Who Came to Dinner)
Meade Minnigerode – co-editor of "The Whiffenpoof Song"
John V. A. Weaver – poet
Kermit Roosevelt – Theodore Roosevelt's son
Dorothy Parker – poet / story writer / dramatist 
Louis Bromfield – novelist
Gerald Mygatt – journalist
Carolyn Wells – comic poet / mystery writer
Rube Goldberg – cartoonist
Bernice Brown – journalist
Wallace Irwin – novelist
Frank Craven – playwright / actor
H. C. Witwer – comic novelist
Elsie Janis – vaudeville star / author
Edward Streeter – author (Father of the Bride)
Sophie Kerr – novelist

Plot
As described in a review in a film magazine, Connemara Moore (Prevost) has two suitors, one likes bobbed hair, the other does not. In escaping from both she enters the car of David Lacy (Harlan), a stranger which proves to have been stolen from bootleggers and is swept into a succession of exciting situations including an attack by hijackers, a fight in a private yacht, and rescue by the stranger – who takes her to his beautiful home to which her own party is brought. Eventually it turns out that the hero was looking for adventure and found romance as well and that the girl has become enmeshed in a trap set by revenue officers. When the time for the show-down comes, she has only one side of her hair bobbed and this means that the handsome stranger has won.

Cast

Cast notes
Dolores Costello and Helene Costello appear in bit parts

Preservation status
A surviving print of Bobbed Hair is housed in a foreign archive.

References

External links

1925 films
1925 comedy films
Silent American comedy films
American silent feature films
American black-and-white films
Films based on works by Louis Bromfield
Films directed by Alan Crosland
Warner Bros. films
1920s American films